Acragas hieroglyphicus is a species of jumping spider in the genus Acragas. The scientific name of this species was first published in 1896 by Peckham & Peckham. These spiders are usually easily found in Panama to Mexico.

References

External links 

hieroglyphicus
Spiders of Central America
Spiders described in 1896